Carlos Alonso González (born 23 August 1952), known as Santillana, is a Spanish former footballer who played as a striker.

He was best known for his Real Madrid spell, which consisted of 17 La Liga seasons and 645 competitive matches. He signed with the club in 1971, from Racing de Santander.

The recipient of more than 50 caps for Spain, Santillana represented the nation in two World Cups and as many European Championships.

Club career
Born in Santillana del Mar, Cantabria, Santillana (nickname taken from birthplace) started playing professionally with local Racing de Santander, moving to Real Madrid and La Liga in 1971 alongside teammate Francisco Aguilar, aged just 19, and proceeding to score ten goals in 34 games in his debut season as the team were crowned league champions.

Santillana went on to win nine league titles, four Copa del Reys and back-to-back UEFA Cups, while scoring in both of the latter competition's finals. He played 645 first-team matches – a record which stood until Manolo Sanchís surpassed him during the 1997–98 campaign – in which he netted 290 goals; the eighth-highest all-time scorer in the first division, with 186 goals in 461 appearances, he never won the Pichichi Trophy.

After just 12 league appearances in 1987–88, in which he scored four times, Santillana retired from football at almost 36, finding the net in a 2–1 home win against Real Valladolid. Madrid conquered three titles in a row in his final three seasons.

International career
Santillana played 56 times and scored 15 goals for the Spain national team, his debut being on 17 April 1975 in a 1–1 draw with Romania for the UEFA Euro 1976 qualifiers held in Madrid. He represented his country in the 1978 and 1982 FIFA World Cups, as well as three European Championships: 1976, reaching the quarter-finals, 1980, failing to advance to the second round, and 1984 which ended with a runner-up finish to hosts France, with the player coming close to scoring the opener on a header saved just off the line by Luis Fernández, of Spanish origin.

On 21 December 1983, during a European Championship qualifying match against Malta that had to be won by 11 goals in order to qualify, Santillana scored a hat-trick in the first half and added a fourth in the second period, as the national side qualified at the expense of the Netherlands – incidentally, his former understudy at Real Madrid, Hipólito Rincón (now at Real Betis), also netted four times in a 12–1 victory.

Style of play
Santillana possessed stellar heading skills despite not reaching 1.80 m, courtesy of his jumping ability, and was widely regarded as one of the best strikers in the history of Spanish football.

Career statistics

Club

International

Honours
Real Madrid
La Liga: 1971–72, 1974–75, 1975–76, 1977–78, 1978–79, 1979–80, 1985–86, 1986–87, 1987–88
Copa del Rey: 1973–74, 1974–75, 1979–80, 1981–82
Copa de la Liga: 1985
UEFA Cup: 1984–85, 1985–86

Spain
UEFA European Championship runner-up: 1984

Individual
Pichichi Trophy (Segunda División): 1970–71

See also
List of La Liga players (400+ appearances)
List of Real Madrid CF records and statistics

References

External links

Biography at Real Madrid Fans 

1952 births
Living people
People from the Western Coast of Cantabria
Spanish footballers
Footballers from Cantabria
Association football forwards
La Liga players
Segunda División players
Racing de Santander players
Real Madrid CF players
UEFA Cup winning players
Spain youth international footballers
Spain under-23 international footballers
Spain amateur international footballers
Spain B international footballers
Spain international footballers
1978 FIFA World Cup players
UEFA Euro 1980 players
1982 FIFA World Cup players
UEFA Euro 1984 players